Vito Badiane (born 2 June 1986 in Dakar) is a professional Senegalese football player, who currently plays for AS Douanes.

Career
Badiane began his career with ASC Jeanne d'Arc Dakar. In January 2006,  he joined SC Covilhã, where he made his debut on 12 March 2006 against FC Vizela. After half a year, he returned to Senegal in July 2006, signing with AS Douanes (Dakar). He played three years with AS Douanes (Dakar), before signing with Maritzburg United F.C. in July 2009. He played his first match on 7 August 2009 against Supersport United F.C. In January 2011, Badiane left the South African club and returned to AS Douanes, where he was named as the Captain in March 2011.

International career
Badiane is former member of the Senegal U-20. He was a member of the Senegal U-23 at CHAN 2009 and the UEMOA Tournament.

Personal life
Badiane is the cousin of the French footballer Thierno Baldé.

Notes

1986 births
Living people
Senegalese footballers
Expatriate soccer players in South Africa
Maritzburg United F.C. players
Senegalese expatriate sportspeople in South Africa
Association football defenders
ASC Jeanne d'Arc players
Footballers from Dakar
S.C. Covilhã players
Expatriate footballers in Portugal
AS Douanes (Senegal) players
2009 African Nations Championship players
Senegal A' international footballers